Watertown Township is a rural township in Carver County, Minnesota, United States. The population was 1,432 as of the 2000 census.

History
Watertown Township was organized in 1858, and named from the numerous bodies of water within its borders.

Geography
According to the United States Census Bureau, the township has a total area of 34.5 square miles (89.3 km), of which 32.5 square miles (84.3 km) is land and 1.9 square miles (5.0 km) (5.62%) is water.

The entire city of Watertown and a portion of the city of Mayer are located within the township geographically but are separate entities.

Township 117 North, Range 25 West, Fifth Principal Meridian of the Public Land Survey System.

Lakes
 Buck Lake
 Goose Lake (north quarter)
 Lippert Lake (east quarter)
 Mud Lake
 Oak Lake
 Rice Lake
 Swede Lake

Adjacent townships
 Franklin Township, Wright County (north)
 Laketown Township (southeast)
 Waconia Township (south)
 Hollywood Township (west)
 Woodland Township, Wright County (northwest)

Cemeteries
The township contains the following cemeteries: Saint Paul's Catholic and Zion.

Major highways
  Minnesota State Highway 7
  Minnesota State Highway 25

Demographics

As of the census of 2000, there were 1,432 people, 478 households, and 393 families residing in the township. There were 485 housing units at an average density of 14.9/sq mi (5.8/km). The racial makeup of the township was 98.88% White, 0.28% African American, 0.21% Native American, 0.56% Asian, and 0.07% from two or more races. Hispanic or Latino of any race were 0.56% of the population.

There were 478 households, out of which 38.9% had children under the age of 18 living with them, 74.1% were married couples living together, 3.8% had a female householder with no husband present, and 17.6% were non-families. 14.2% of all households were made up of individuals, and 4.4% had someone living alone who was 65 years of age or older.  The average household size was 2.88 and the average family size was 3.22.

In the township the population was spread out, with 27.1% under the age of 18, 7.1% from 18 to 24, 29.3% from 25 to 44, 27.7% from 45 to 64, and 8.9% who were 65 years of age or older.  The median age was 38 years. For every 100 females, there were 101.7 males.  For every 100 females age 18 and over, there were 103.5 males.

The median income for a household in the township was $61,083, and the median income for a family was $67,679. Males had a median income of $42,250 versus $30,724 for females. The per capita income for the township was $24,005.  About 3.4% of families and 6.2% of the population were below the poverty line, including 4.1% of those under age 18 and 13.8% of those age 65 or over.

Politics

References
 United States National Atlas
 United States Census Bureau 2007 TIGER/Line Shapefiles
 United States Board on Geographic Names (GNIS)

Townships in Carver County, Minnesota
Townships in Minnesota